Fueled by the previous year's release of the colorful and appealing Pac-Man, the audience for arcade video games in 1981 became much wider. Pac-Man influenced maze games began appearing in arcades and on home systems. Pac-Man was the highest-grossing video game for the second year in a row. Nintendo's Donkey Kong defined the unnamed platform game genre, while Konami's Scramble established forced-scrolling shooters. The lesser known Jump Bug combined the two concepts into both the first scrolling platform game and the first platform shooter. Other arcade hits released in 1981 include Defender, Frogger, and the Galaxian sequel Galaga.

On the Apple II, Ultima I and Wizardry: Proving Grounds of the Mad Overlord each kicked-off a long running role-playing game series. The Atari VCS port of Asteroids was a major hit for the console. The best-selling home system was Nintendo's Game & Watch for the second year in a row.

Financial performance
 The arcade video game market in the US generates $4.8 billion in revenue.
 The home video game market in the US generates $1 billion in sales revenue, with Atari remaining the market leader.
 The home video game market in Europe is worth $200 million.

Highest-grossing arcade games

Japan
In Japan, the following titles were the highest-grossing arcade video games of 1981, according to the annual Game Machine chart.

United States
In the United States, the following titles were the top three highest-grossing arcade games of 1981, according to the annual Cash Box and RePlay arcade charts.

The following titles were the top-grossing arcade games of each month in 1981, according to the Play Meter and RePlay arcade charts.

Best-selling home video games
The following titles were the best-selling home video games in 1981.

Best-selling home systems

Events

Magazines 
 January – Atari computer magazine ANALOG Computing begins 9 years of publication. Most issues include at least one BASIC game and one machine language game.
 November – The British video game magazine Computer and Video Games (C&VG) starts.
 Winter – Arnie Katz and Bill Kunkel found Electronic Games, the first magazine on video games and generally recognized as the beginning of video game journalism.

Business
 New companies: DK'Tronics, Games by Apollo, Gebelli Software, Imagic, Spectravision, Starpath, Synapse Software
 Defunct: APF Electronics

Births

May
 May 11 – JP Karliak: American actor, voice actor and comedian

Notable releases

Games 
Arcade

 February – Konami releases Scramble, the first side-scrolling shooter with forced scrolling and multiple distinct levels.
 February – Williams Electronics releases influential scrolling shooter Defender.
 July 9 – Nintendo releases Donkey Kong, which introduces the characters of Donkey Kong and Mario, and sets the template for the platform game genre. It is also one of the first video games with an integral storyline.
 August – Konami releases Frogger.
 September – Namco releases Galaga, the sequel to Galaxian which becomes more popular than the original.
 October – Frogger is distributed in North America by Sega-Gremlin.
 October 18 – Sega releases Turbo, a racing  game with a third-person rear-view perspective.
October 21 – Williams Electronics releases Stargate, the sequel to Defender.
 October – Rock-Ola's Fantasy is the first game with a continue feature.
October – Atari, Inc. releases Tempest, one of the first games to use Atari's Color-QuadraScan vector display technology. It was also the first game to allow the player to choose their starting level (a system Atari dubbed "SkillStep").
 November – Namco releases Bosconian, a multidirectional shooter with voice.
 December – Jump Bug, the first scrolling platform game, developed by Hoei/Coreland and Alpha Denshi, is distributed in North America by Rock-Ola under license from Sega.
 Midway releases fixed-shooter Gorf with multiple distinct stages.
 Taito releases abstract, twin-stick shooter Space Dungeon.
 Data East releases the vertically-scrolling isometric maze game Treasure Island.

Console
 Atari, Inc.'s port of Asteroids is a major release for the Atari VCS, and is the first game for the system to use bank-switching.
 Mattel releases Utopia for Intellivision, one of the first city construction games and possibly the first sim game for a console.

Computer
 June – Ultima is released, beginning a successful computer role-playing game series.
 September – Wizardry: Proving Grounds of the Mad Overlord for the Apple II is the first in a computer role-playing franchise that eventually spans eight games.
 IBM and Microsoft include the game DONKEY.BAS with the IBM PC, arguably the first IBM PC compatible game.
 Muse Software releases the stealth action adventure Castle Wolfenstein for the Apple II.
 The Atari Program Exchange publishes Caverns of Mars, a vertically scrolling shooter for the Atari 8-bit family, and wargame Eastern Front (1941). APX also sells the source code to Eastern Front.
 Epyx releases turn-based monster game Crush, Crumble and Chomp!.
 BudgeCo's Raster Blaster sparks interest in more realistic Apple II pinball simulations and is the precursor to Pinball Construction Set.
 Infocom releases Zork II: The Wizard of Frobozz.

Hardware 
Arcade
 July – the Namco Warp & Warp arcade system board is released.
 October – the VCO Object, the first arcade system board dedicated to pseudo-3D, sprite-scaling graphics, debuts with the release of Turbo.

Computer
 March 5 – Timex releases the Sinclair Research ZX81 in the UK, which is significantly less expensive than other computers on the market.
 June – Texas Instruments releases the TI-99/4A, an update to 1979's TI-99/4.
 August 12 – the IBM Personal Computer is released for USD$1,565, with 16K RAM, no disk drives, and 4-color CGA graphics.
 Astrovision distributes the Bally Computer System after buying the rights from Bally/Midway.
 Acorn Computers Ltd releases the BBC Micro home computer.
 Commodore Business Machines releases the VIC-20 home computer.
 NEC releases the PC-8801 home computer in Japan.

Handheld
 November – Nintendo's Game & Watch is released in Sweden.
 Microvision is discontinued.

See also
1981 in games

References

 
Video games
Video games by year